The 2009 Ole Miss Rebels football team represented the University of Mississippi during the 2009 NCAA Division I FBS football season. The team was led by Houston Nutt, who was in his second season as the Rebels' head coach. Ole Miss has been a member of the Southeastern Conference (SEC) since the league's inception in 1932, and has participated in that conference's Western Division since its formation in 1992. The Rebels played their seven home games in 2009 at Vaught–Hemingway Stadium in Oxford, Mississippi, which has been Ole Miss football's home since 1915. The Rebels finished the season 9–4, 4–4 in SEC play and won their second straight Cotton Bowl Classic 21–7 against Oklahoma State.

Previous season
First year head coach Houston Nutt led the team from four straight losing seasons to a 9–4 record and a 5–3 mark in conference play. The improvement from 2007–2008 was the best single-season improvement for an Ole Miss team since 1947, when Johnny Vaught debuted as coach. The Rebels' second- place finish in the SEC Western Division was their second best finish in the division since its inception in 1992. The 2008 squad concluded the season by defeating Texas Tech 47–34 in the 2009 Cotton Bowl.

Key losses from the 2008 season team
Michael Oher – graduated; drafted in the first round of the 2009 NFL Draft by the Baltimore Ravens
Peria Jerry – graduated; drafted in the first round of the 2009 NFL Draft by the Atlanta Falcons
Mike Wallace – graduated; drafted in the third round of the 2009 NFL Draft by the Pittsburgh Steelers
Jamarca Sanford – graduated; drafted in the seventh round of the 2009 NFL Draft by the Minnesota Vikings
Tony Fein – graduated; signed as a free agent with the Seattle Seahawks and later was signed by the Baltimore Ravens before being cut

Rankings

* Tied with Penn State

Schedule

Schedule notes
The 2009 Ole Miss Football Schedule was officially released on March 17, 2009.
ESPN.com tabbed Ole Miss' 2009 non-conference schedule as the 3rd softest in the country.
The week one game against Memphis was played on Sunday, September 6 and was nationally televised on ESPN.
The week four game against South Carolina was played on Thursday, September 24, as part of the ESPN College Football Thursday Primetime package.
The 2009 season marked the first time Ole Miss has ever played Southeastern Louisiana, UAB and Northern Arizona in football.

2009 season highlights
On July 7, 2009, the Ole Miss athletic department announced that the 2009 training camp and team would be the subject of a reality television show called Gridiron U, which will air on TruTV (formerly known as Court TV). Filming was scheduled to begin in early August and end September 6. The camera crew came in June to interview players and coaches as well as to film key locations on campus. However, head coach Houston Nutt canceled the team's participation in the new show.

Ole Miss was on the cover of Sports Illustrated for the August 17, 2009 issue. SI's preseason rankings has the Rebels ranked at #6.

In late August 2009, the Ole Miss Athletic Department announced that season tickets were sold out for what is believed to be the first time in school history.

In the third week of the season, on September 20, 2009, Ole Miss was ranked #4 in the AP poll and #5 in the Coaches Poll, the highest the Rebels have been ranked since the Archie Manning-lead, and John Vaught-coached, team of 1970 which also made it to #4. Ole Miss' highest ranking ever was #1 in 1964.

Ole Miss set a school record with four straight games, going back to the 2008 season, of scoring forty or more points after defeating Southeastern Louisiana 52–6 on September 19, 2009. Also as of the Southeastern Louisiana win, the Rebels had the second longest winning streak in the nation, having won eight straight games dating back to the 2008 season. The national champion Florida team had the first longest winning streak after Utah lost.

Ole Miss' defeat of Tennessee on November 14, 2009 was the first time Tennessee had ever lost in Ole Miss' home stadium. Tennessee now holds a 5–1 mark against Ole Miss in Ole Miss' home stadium.

Ole Miss' defeat of LSU on November 21, 2009 was the Rebels first win at home against LSU since 1998.

Game summaries

Memphis
Pregame Line: Ole Miss –17.5

Southeastern Louisiana
Pregame Line: N/A

South Carolina
Pregame Line: Ole Miss –4.5

Vanderbilt
Pregame Line: Ole Miss –10.5

Alabama
Pregame Line: Alabama –3.5

UAB
Pregame Line: Ole Miss –23

Arkansas
Pregame Line: Ole Miss –6.5

Auburn
Pregame Line: Ole Miss –5.5

Northern Arizona
Pregame Line: N/A

Tennessee
Pregame Line: Ole Miss –5.5

LSU
Pregame Line: Ole Miss –6

Mississippi State
Pregame Line: Ole Miss –7.5

Oklahoma State
Pregame Line: Ole Miss –3.5

Coaching staff

Staff notes
On January 16, Terry Price began his second stint with the Ole Miss Rebels football staff. He coached defensive ends for the Rebels from 1995–98. He then went on to be the defensive line coach at Auburn from 1999 to 2008.
On January 20, former Rebel football player Lanier Goethie signed on as a graduate assistant. In his four years playing Linebacker for Ole Miss (1999 to 2002), he had a total of 178 tackles and served as a team co-captain as a senior. He was also the 2002 Chucky Mullins Courage Award recipient.

NFL prospects
Twelve Ole Miss players who ended their career at Ole Miss this year were either taken in the 2010 NFL Draft or signed free-agent contracts with NFL teams.  Dexter McCluster (Kansas City Chiefs; 2nd round; 36th overall pick), OL John Jerry (Miami Dolphins; 3rd round; 73rd overall pick), S Kendrick Lewis (Kansas City Chiefs; 5th round; 136th overall pick) and DE Greg Hardy (Carolina Panthers; 6th round; 175th overall pick) were drafted while QB Jevan Snead (Tampa Bay Buccaneers), RB Cordera Eason (Cincinnati Bengals), TE Gerald Harris (Tennessee Titans), LB Patrick Trahan (Tennessee Titans), WR Shay Hodge (San Francisco 49ers), CB Marshay Green (Arizona Cardinals), CB Cassius Vaughn (Denver Broncos) and DE Emmanuel Stephens (Atlanta Falcons) signed free agent contracts.

References

Ole Miss
Ole Miss Rebels football seasons
Cotton Bowl Classic champion seasons
Ole Miss Rebels football